Eriogonum nidularium is a species of wild buckwheat known by the common name birdnest buckwheat. It is native to the sandy flats and desert dry washes of the Mojave Desert and Great Basin in the western United States, where it is common and abundant. This is a distinctive annual herb producing a thin, multibranched stem which curves in on itself to form a rounded, tangled mass.

Description
The plant resembles a bird nest, hence its common name. Its rounded form rarely reaches 30 centimeters in height and its curving twigs are mostly naked, the small leaves appearing mainly at the base of the plant.

When in bloom the plant produces tiny fan-shaped hanging clusters of flowers at nodes along the thin branches of the stem. The flowers are yellowish to pinkish, sometimes with small streaks of bright red.

External links

Jepson Manual Treatment - Eriogonum nidularium
Eriogonum nidularium - Photo gallery

nidularium
Flora of Idaho
Flora of Oregon
Flora of Nevada
Flora of Arizona
Flora of New Mexico
Flora of Utah
Flora of the Sonoran Deserts
Flora of the California desert regions
Flora of the Great Basin
Flora without expected TNC conservation status